Luca Dal Fabbro (born 1 January 1951) is an Italian actor and voice actor.

Biography
Dal Fabbro contributes to voicing characters in anime, cartoons, and more content. He serves as the official Italian voice of Steve Buscemi and he is well known for providing the voice of the character Dr. Heinz Doofenshmirtz in the Italian-language version of the animated series Phineas and Ferb and since 2003, he has voiced Piglet in the Italian dub of the Winnie the Pooh franchise. He has also dubbed other actors such as Johnny Depp, Ron Howard, William H. Macy and others.

He is the son of actors Vanna Polverosi and Nino Dal Fabbro. He works at Dubbing Brothers, Sefit - CDC, LaBibi.it, and other dubbing studios in Italy.

Voice work

Anime and animation
 Dr. Heinz Doofenshmirtz in Phineas and Ferb
 Dr. Heinz Doofenshmirtz and Doofenshmirtz-2 in Phineas and Ferb the Movie: Across the 2nd Dimension
Molla in Casper: A Spirited Beginning
 Piglet in A Very Merry Pooh Year
 Piglet in Pooh's Heffalump Movie
 Piglet in Winnie the Pooh
 Piglet in My Friends Tigger & Pooh
 Frank in The Rescuers Down Under
 Goyan in Pretty Cure Splash Star
 Chum in Finding Nemo
 Charlie in Candy Candy
 Jaq in Cinderella II: Dreams Come True
 Jaq (Speaking voice) in Cinderella III: A Twist in Time
 Charles in Hello! Sandybell (1st dub)
 Ryuusuke Damon in Space Battleship Yamato III
 Roger M. Klotz in Doug
 Kipper's Dad in Kipper
 Baxter Bevel in Rolie Polie Olie
 Munk in Happily N'Ever After
 Splatter in Thomas and the Magic Railroad
 Madonaldo in Maya & Miguel
 Indian in A Town Called Panic (2nd dub)
 Indian in A Town Called Panic (film)
 The Willie Brothers in Home on the Range
 Cuppa Joe in Codename: Kids Next Door
 Mr. Lunt in VeggieTales
 Wags the Dog in The Wiggles
 Bertie in Tomodachi Life: The TV Series
 Ichabeezer in VeggieTales in the House
 Excalibur in Soul Eater
 Rikdo Koshi in Excel Saga
 Ms. Aki in Magical Shopping Arcade Abenobashi
 Wildcat in TaleSpin
 Jim E. Lovelock in Dominion: Tank Police
 Frank in The Rescuers Down Under
 Witch Doctor in George of the Jungle (2007 TV series)
 Randall Boggs in Monsters University
 and more

Live action shows and movies
 Steve Bolander in American Graffiti
 Gator Lerner in Platoon
 Golikov in The Beast
 Valentin Arregui in Kiss of the Spider Woman
 Captain Frye in The Rock
 Hidlick in The Brothers Grimm
 Simeon in The Truman Show
 Bob Zmuda in Man on the Moon
 Deputy Clinton Pell in Mississippi Burning Kent "Flounder" Dorfman in National Lampoon's Animal House
 Pip in Bear in the Big Blue House
 David "Dave" Veltri in The Wedding Singer Sweet Eddy in The Mask Steve Brady (1st voice) in Sex and the City Quark (Season 7) in Star Trek: Deep Space Nine Bucky in G-Force Ben Stevenson in The Gregory Hines Show Dr. Noseworthy in Shorts (2009 film) César in Dante 01 Victor Pascow in Pet Sematary Romero in Spy Kids 2: The Island of Lost Dreams Romero in Spy Kids 3-D: Game Over Ephialtes in 300 George Franco in I Think I Love My Wife Ed Furillo in City Slickers Donny in The Big Lebowski Jijii in Ichi the Killer Lutorious in The Eagle (2011 film) Nigel Gruff in The Replacements (film) Harlan Rook in The Dead Pool The Talking Cricket, the Pantalone Marionette and Rabbit #1 in Pinocchio (2019 film, English version)
 and more

Video games
 Dr. Heinz Doofenshmirtz and Doofenshmirtz-2 in Phineas and Ferb: Across the 2nd DimensionWork as a dubbing director
 Bear in the Big Blue House Hero: 108 Buzz Lightyear of Star Command The Chamber Y Tu Mamá También Lampião e Maria Bonita (1st dub)
 Canterbury's Law Don't Blame Me The Wedding Singer Best Men Happily N'Ever After Walk the Line Reunion Patch Adams Waking Life Harriet the Spy Haunted North Country The Last of the Mohicans Kangaroo Jack Dangerous Game ChalkZone''

References

External links
 

1951 births
Living people
Male actors from Rome
Italian male voice actors
Italian voice directors
20th-century Italian male actors
21st-century Italian male actors